The Chief of Staff of the Indonesian Navy (abbreviated KSAL or KASAL) is the highest position in the Indonesian Navy. The position is held by the four-star Admiral or Marine General, appointed by and reporting directly to the Commander of the Indonesian National Armed Forces. Chief of Staff is assisted by Vice Chief of Staff of the Indonesian Navy, position is held by three-star Admiral or Marine General.

Responsibilities 
As stated by presidential decree 66/2019, the responsibilities of Chief of Staff of the Indonesian Navy are as follow:

 lead the navy on the power consolidation / development and operational readiness
 assist the Commander of the Indonesian National Armed Forces on policy development about navy's power posture, doctrine, strategy, and military operations
 assist the Commander of the Indonesian National Armed Forces on national defense component according to the navy need
 execute other navy duty mandated by the Commander of the Indonesian National Armed Forces

List of Chiefs of Staff

See also
Commander of the Indonesian National Armed Forces
Chief of Staff of the Indonesian Army
Chief of Staff of the Indonesian Air Force

References

Chiefs of Staff of the Indonesian Navy
Indonesia